Nucleation in microcellular plastic is an important stage which decides the final cell size, cell density and cell morphology of the foam. In the recent past, numerous researchers have studied the cell nucleation phenomenon in microcellular polymers.

Studies were performed with ultrasound induced nucleation during microcellular foaming of Acrylonitrile butadiene styrene polymers. M.C.Guo studied nucleation under the shear action. As the shear enhanced, the cell size diminished and thereby increased the cell density in the foam.

Plastics
Foams